

The Diamond Creek Trail is a shared use path for cyclists and pedestrians, which follows Diamond Creek through the north eastern outer suburbs of Melbourne, Victoria, Australia.

It generally follows the creek and railway to Eltham where it joins the Main Yarra Trail (also called Yarra River Trail).  It is mostly flat with some minor rises. Scenery includes park lands, the creek valley, and semi-rural suburbia.  The trail is fully paved with either concrete or asphalt and is not much affected by tree roots.  It is a trail for leisurely riding rather than high-speed commuting and is shared with walkers, family groups, children, dogs (on leash) and the elderly.  The path is narrow in parts and has many added 90 degree bends to vary interest.

The trail is poorly signposted and there are a two points where the unwary traveller can become easily lost.  There are also road crossings and an unprotected rail crossing.  The main features are Edendale Farm Community Environment Centre and Diamond Valley Railway.

Following the Path
The start of the trail is unmarked but starts not far from Diamond Creek station. From the station cross Main Hurstbridge Road, turn right and cross the road bridge. The trail starts on the other side of the bridge next to the toilet block at Diamond Creek Reserve.

The trail crosses Allendale Rd near the rail crossing and then runs alongside the track. Between here and Eltham you pass Edendale Farm (admission fee payable) or check out the animals at the back fence.

At Edendale Farm you can divert left to another trail (near the crossing at Wattletree Rd) that follows Main Rd and meets with the Maroondah Aqueduct Trail. The Maroondah Aqueduct Trail in turn, loops back to Diamond Creek Trail back at Allendale Rd. To keep the cycling grades to a minimum and avoid the brutal Allendale Rd climb, always do the Maroondah Aqueduct Trail loop anti-clockwise.

The trail then runs along Railway Parade until it crosses the track on an automated crossing then runs along the footpath into the Eltham business district. Eltham railway station is 300 metres down the footpath after the crossing.

Continuing the trail again disappears. One block after the Elsa Court crossing turn right into Diamond St and then continue left in front of the tennis centre.  Keep straight on for 200 metres – the trail resumes on the other side of the tennis centre, at Eltham Central Park.

At Withers Way, Eltham, the trail appears to run straight ahead towards Eltham High School. In fact, turn sharp left and cross the footbridge. At this point a detour to the nearby Montsalvat can be made by crossing Main Rd at the pedestrian crossing and heading up Dalton St. Continuing, the trail narrows and twists through the park, until it comes to Eltham Lower Park. The park is famous for the Diamond Valley Railway, much-loved by generations of children (and adults).

On the south side of Eltham Lower Park continue to the left (east) where the path meets up with the footbridge across the Yarra. Crossing the footbridge leads directly to the Yarra River Trail about 1 km east of Westerfolds Park.

Cycling time at a leisurely pace: one hour. The next railway station is Heidelberg, about 14 kilometres along the Yarra River Trail.

Landmarks 
Edendale Farm Community, Montsalvat, Diamond Valley Railway.

Connections
The northern end meets with a trail on Main Rd that leads to the Maroondah Aqueduct Trail. The south end of the Diamond Creek Trail intersects the Yarra River Trail.

References 

Bike rides around Melbourne 3rd edition, 2009, Julia Blunden, Open Spaces Publishing, 
Bike Paths Victoria sixth edition, 2004. Edited and published by Sabey & Associates Pty Ltd. pp115.

External links
 Edendale Community Farm
 Montsalvat
 Diamond Valley Railway

Bike paths in Melbourne